Ekaterina Vladimirovna Shalimova (born 1 June 2000) is a Russian tennis player.

Shalimova who has career-high WTA rankings of 379 in singles and 340 in doubles. She made her WTA Tour main-draw debut at the 2019 St. Petersburg Trophy in the doubles competition, partnering Daria Mishina.

ITF Circuit finals

Singles: 4 (2 titles, 2 runner–ups)

Doubles: 7 (2 titles, 5 runner-ups)

References

External links
 
 

2000 births
Living people
Russian female tennis players
21st-century Russian women